The Trans-Taiga Road is an extremely remote wilderness road in northern Quebec, Canada.

Description

The road's northeastern terminus is almost at the 55th parallel north, making it the northernmost continuous road in Eastern North America. Though the terminus is also the farthest point from any town via road in North America ( from Radisson), is nonetheless relatively close –  – to Schefferville geographically. It does not, however, provide access to it, as the intervening terrain is impassable even in an all-terrain vehicle. The road's end is also close to the southern limit of Nunavik, Quebec's Inuit region which is negotiating for autonomous status within Quebec.

The Trans-Taiga Road branches off from the James Bay Road at kilometre 544. It was built as an access road to the hydro-electric generating stations of Hydro-Québec along the La Grande River and Caniapiscau River. Several outfitters are established along this road, providing wilderness hunting and fishing expeditions, and some may also provide fuel, food and lodging. Otherwise, there are no services along this road.

While the Trans-Taiga Road is reportedly drivable by ordinary passenger vehicles for its entire length, Hydro-Québec recommends use of 4WD vehicles for the section between Brisay and Caniapiscau, which is of a rougher grade than the rest of the road.

As the name of the road indicates, this road winds its way through Quebec's vast boreal forest, characterized by stunted spruce and pine, bogs and rocky outcroppings. Taiga is the Russian term for the same type of forest.

Extension

Regional and provincial officials have suggested building a link from the road's northeastern terminus in Caniapiscau to Kuujjuaq, several hundred kilometres to the north in Nunavik, also accessing Schefferville along the way. As the road east of Centrale Brisay is extremely rough (large rocks on the road surface), part of the existing road would also require upgrade; an extension via Schefferville would likely require crossing the province of Newfoundland and Labrador.

In 2020 a Memorandum of Understanding was signed between the James Bay Cree Nation of Eeyou Istchee and the Government of Québec. The MOU sets a roadmap for infrastructure development. Phase III of the Infrastructure program includes extension of the Trans-Taiga road eastward to connect with Schefferville, over an approximate distance of 200 km.

Waypoints

See also
James Bay Project
List of Quebec provincial highways

References

External links

Unofficial site, part of the James Bay Road site
Plan by Quebec Provincial government includes study of a possible extension to Kuujjuaq.
Mirage Outfitter

Roads in Nord-du-Québec
Roads in Côte-Nord